The Black Robe, aka Police Night Court: The Black Robe is a 30-minute American docu-drama anthology court show based on actual police night court cases. Forty-plus episodes aired  on the National Broadcasting Company from May 18, 1949 until March 30, 1950. It was produced by Warren Wade and directed by Herbert Bayard Swope, Jr. Its creator and writer was Phillips H. Lord.  

Frankie Thomas, Sr. portrayed the judge, and John Green was the court clerk.

A review in the trade publication Billboard praised the assortment of non-actor characters but commented that "the program goes overboard" in its efforts to achieve realistic images and dialog. The reviewer also found that the episode presented too many cases, which limited their development and resulted in a bare-bones presentation of each case.

References

External links
Police Night Court: The Black Robe at CVTA

1940s American anthology television series
1950s American anthology television series
1949 American television series debuts
1950 American television series endings
Black-and-white American television shows
NBC original programming